"The Bottle Imp" is an 1891 short story by the Scottish author Robert Louis Stevenson usually found in the short story collection Island Nights' Entertainments. It was first published in the New York Herald (February–March 1891) and Black and White London (March–April 1891).  In it, the protagonist buys a bottle with an imp inside that grants wishes.  However, the bottle is cursed; if the holder dies bearing it, his or her soul is forfeit to hell.

Plot
Keawe, a poor Native Hawaiian, buys a strange unbreakable bottle from a sad, elderly gentleman who credits the bottle with his fortune.  He promises that an imp residing in the bottle will also grant Keawe his every desire.

Of course, there is a catch. The bottle must be sold, for cash, at a loss, i.e. for less than its owner originally paid, and cannot be thrown or given away, or else it will magically return to him. All of these rules must be explained by each seller to each purchaser. If an owner of the bottle dies without having sold it in the prescribed manner, that person's soul will burn for eternity in Hell.

The bottle was said to have been brought to Earth by the Devil and first purchased by Prester John for millions; it was owned by Napoleon and Captain James Cook and accounted for their great successes. By the end of the story the price has diminished to fifty dollars.

Keawe buys the bottle and instantly tests it by wishing his money to be refunded, and by trying to sell it for more than he paid and abandoning it,  to test if the story is true. When these all work as described, he realizes the bottle does indeed have unholy power. He wishes for his heart's desire: a big, fancy mansion on a landed estate, and finds his wish granted, but at a price: his beloved uncle and cousins have been killed in a boating accident, leaving Keawe sole heir to his uncle's fortune. Keawe is horrified, but uses the money to build his house. Having all he wants, and being happy, he explains the risks to a friend who buys the bottle from him.

Keawe lives a happy life, but there is something missing. Walking along the beach one night, he meets a beautiful woman, Kokua. They soon fall in love and become engaged. Keawe's happiness is shattered on the night of his betrothal, when he discovers that he has contracted the then-incurable disease of leprosy. He must give up his house and wife, and live in Kalaupapa—a remote community for lepers—unless he can recover the bottle and use it to cure himself.

Keawe begins this quest by attempting to track down the friend to whom he sold the bottle, but the friend has become suddenly wealthy and left Hawaii. Keawe traces the path of the bottle through many buyers and eventually finds a Haole on Beritania Street, Honolulu.  The man of European ancestry has both good and bad news for Keawe: (a) he owns the bottle and is very willing to sell, but (b) he had only paid two cents for it. Therefore, if Keawe buys it, he will not be able to resell it.

Keawe decides to buy the bottle anyway, for the price of one cent, and indeed cures himself.  Now, however, he is understandably despondent: how can he possibly enjoy life, knowing his doom? His wife mistakes his depression for regret at their marriage, and asks for a divorce. Keawe confesses his secret to her.

His wife suggests they sail, with the bottle, to Tahiti; on that archipelago the colonists of French Polynesia use centimes, a coin worth one fifth of an American cent.  This offers a potential recourse for Keawe.

When they arrive, however, the suspicious natives will not touch the cursed bottle. Kokua determines to make a supreme sacrifice to save her husband from his fate.  Since, however, she knows he would never sell the bottle to her knowingly, Kokua is forced to bribe an old sailor to buy the bottle for four centimes, with the understanding that she will secretly buy it back for three. Now Keawe is happy, but she carries the curse.

Keawe discovers what his wife has done, and resolves to sacrifice himself for her in the same manner. He arranges for a brutish boatswain to buy the bottle for two centimes, promising he will buy it back for one, thus sealing his doom. However, the drunken sailor refuses to part with it, and is unafraid of the prospect of Hell. "I reckon I'm going anyway," he says.

Keawe returns to his wife, both of them free from the curse, and the reader is encouraged to believe that they live happily ever after.

Background
The theme of the bottle imp can be found in the German legend Spiritus familiaris by the Brothers Grimm as well.  At the time of publication in 1891, the currency system of the Kingdom of Hawaii included cent coins that circulated at par with the U.S. penny.

The novel reflects Stevenson's impressions gained during his five-month visit of the Kingdom of Hawaii in 1889. Part of the storyline takes place in the little town Hoʻokena at the Kona coast of the island of Hawaii, which the author visited. In a scene which takes place in Honolulu Stevenson mentions Heinrich Berger, the bandmaster of the Royal Hawaiian Band. The name of Keawe's wife refers to the Hawaiian word kōkua, which means help. In 1889 Stevenson also visited the leper colony on the island of Molokaʻi and met Father Damien there. Therefore, he had a first-hand experience from the fate of lepers. Several times Stevenson uses the Hawaiian word Haole, which is the usual term for Caucasians, for example describing the last owner of the bottle.

The story could be considered as both a continuation of and a rather light-hearted counterpoint to the theme of selling one's soul to The Devil, manifested in the numerous depictions of Doctor Faust as well as in such stories as "The Devil and Tom Walker" by Washington Irving and "The Devil and Daniel Webster" by Stephen Vincent Benet.

Publication
"The Bottle Imp" was published in the missionary magazine O le sulu Samoa (The Samoan Torch) in 1891, with the title "O Le Tala I Le Fagu Aitu". According to Publishers Weekly and School Library Journal (both quoted by Amazon.com) "this tale was originally published, in Samoan, in 1891". The Locus Online Index to Science Fiction similarly states "The Stevenson story was first published in Samoan in 1891, appearing later that year in English." The Project Gutenberg text of the story has a note by Stevenson which says "...the tale has been designed and written for a Polynesian audience..." which also suggests initial publication in Polynesia, not in the United States.

Bottle Imp paradox
The premise of the story creates a logical paradox similar to the unexpected hanging paradox. Clearly no rational person would buy it for one cent as this would make it impossible for it to be sold at a loss. However, it follows that no rational person would buy it for two cents either if it is later to be sold only to a rational person for a loss. By backward induction, the bottle cannot be sold for any price in a perfectly rational world. And yet, the actions of the people in the story do not seem particularly unwise.

The story shows that the paradox could be resolved by the existence of certain characters:

 Someone who loves the bottle's current owner enough to sacrifice his or her own soul for that person.
 Someone who believes he or she is inevitably destined for Hell already.
 Someone who believes he or she will never die.
 Someone who believes there is someone else willing to make an irrational decision to purchase the bottle.

Since the exchange rates of different currencies can fluctuate with respect to one another, it is also possible that the value of the bottle could increase from one transaction to the next even if the stated price decreases. This leads to an endless staircase-type paradox which would make it possible, in theory, for the bottle to keep getting sold infinitely many times. However, this might be forbidden depending on how the bottle imp interprets the idea of "selling at a loss".

Adaptations

A silent film based on Stevenson's story was released in 1917. The screenplay was adapted by Charles Maigne. The film was directed by Marshall Neilan, and starred Sessue Hayakawa, Lehua Waipahu, H. Komshi, George Kuwa, Guy Oliver and James Neill.

The Witch's Tale, a horror anthology radio series, adapted the story as "The Wonderful Bottle" in 1934.

Käthe von Nagy was the star in the German film Love, Death and the Devil (1934) and the French film The Devil in the Bottle (1935).

A West German stop motion animated feature film based on the story and directed by the Diehl Brothers was released in 1952 under the title Der Flaschenteufel.

An Italian TV adaptation "Il diavolo nella bottiglia" aired on Rai2 on 23 Jun 1981 as part of the horror anthology series "I giochi del diavolo".

The Imp In The Bottle, was episode number 143 of the CBS Radio Mystery Theater, adapted in 1974.

The Devil Inside, an opera based on Stevenson's short story written by the novelist Louise Welsh and the composer Stuart MacRae, premiered at the Theatre Royal, Glasgow in January 2016. The opera was a co-production between Scottish Opera and Music Theatre Wales.

The story has inspired the trick-taking card game Bottle Imp, designed by Günter Cornett. It was first published in 1995 by Bambus Spieleverlag, and has been republished several times since under the name "Bottle Imp".

See also
Greater fool theory
Unexpected hanging paradox

References

External links

Short stories by Robert Louis Stevenson
1891 short stories
Game theory
Native Hawaiian
Works originally published in the New York Herald
Hawaii in fiction
Short stories adapted into films

fr:Veillées des Îles#La Bouteille endiablée